Artur Łukasz Krysiak (born 11 August 1989) is a Polish professional footballer who plays as a goalkeeper for Start Brzeziny. He previously played in the Scottish Premier League for Gretna and Motherwell and in the Football League for Swansea City, Burton Albion, Exeter City and Yeovil Town. He also played for the Poland national under-19 team.

Club career
Born in Łódź, Łódź Voivodeship, Krysiak trained at the academy of UKS SMS Łódź from 2004 until 31 August 2006 when he joined English Championship club Birmingham City on a three-year contract for a fee of £60,000. After only two hours on trial at Birmingham, goalkeeping coach Nigel Spink knew that "he was the real deal". Academy director Terry Westley described him as "a strong character [who] really stands out as a massive presence in goal" and believes that Krysiak can reach the top as "he has that Premiership mentality and quality".

He spent the second half of the 2007–08 season on loan at Scottish Premier League club Gretna. He made his debut on 16 February 2008 after Greg Fleming was suspended. Due to the good form of Fleming, Krysiak started in only three matches; on his third appearance he was named in Setanta Sports' SPL Team of the Week. He made one further appearance, impressing after coming on as a substitute against Hearts on 13 May 2008.

At the start of the 2008–09 season, Krysiak joined York City of the Conference Premier on loan for a month, as cover for injured goalkeeper Michael Ingham. He made his debut in a 1–0 victory against Crawley Town and was substituted during his second appearance against Wrexham after suffering a dislocated finger, which resulted in him returning to Birmingham.

After Birmingham's second-choice goalkeeper Colin Doyle underwent a knee operation, Krysiak replaced him on the substitutes' bench for the Championship match against Doncaster Rovers in September 2008. He joined fellow Championship team Swansea City on a three-month emergency loan on 23 September, and on the same day featured on the bench in a 1–0 victory over rivals Cardiff City in the League Cup. He made his debut for Swansea in a 3–0 win over Southampton in the Championship, in which he played the full 90 minutes. Krysiak was named in the Championship team of the week after making his debut for Swansea. He returned to Birmingham following the conclusion of this loan spell.

On 2 January 2009 Krysiak joined Scottish Premier League club Motherwell on loan for the remainder of the 2008–09 season. He made one appearance at Motherwell, which came on the final day of the season, in a 2–1 defeat to Kilmarnock.

In May 2009, Birmingham confirmed that Krysiak would be released when his contract expired at the end of the season. However, a few weeks later he signed a one-year contract with an option for a further year with the club.

On 10 August 2009 Krysiak joined Burton Albion, newly promoted to League Two, on loan for a month. He made his debut in a 5–2 victory over Morecambe on 15 August. After he produced "a string of impressive performances", the loan was first extended until 2 January 2010, and then for the rest of the season. In April, he injured his ankle, with recovery time expected to be from six to eight weeks.

In April 2010, Burton offered Krysiak a permanent contract, while Birmingham announced that he would be released when his contract expired at the end of June 2010.

Krysiak agreed to sign for League One club Exeter City when his Birmingham contract expired on 1 July.
Krysiak made his Exeter league debut against Brighton in November 2010. On 7 May 2014, Krysiak announced on Exeweb (fans forum) that he would be leaving the club.

Krysiak joined newly relegated League One side Yeovil Town on a two-year contract on 30 June 2014. He was released by Yeovil at the end of the 2017–18 season.

On 9 August 2018, Krysiak signed for Norwegian Eliteserien side FK Bodø/Glimt on a contract until 2019.

On 22 January 2019, Krysiak returned to Poland to join I liga side Odra Opole signing a contract until 30 June 2019.

International career
He played for the Poland national under-19 team in the 2008 European Championship elite qualification round.

Career statistics

References

External links

1989 births
Living people
Footballers from Łódź
Polish footballers
Poland youth international footballers
Association football goalkeepers
Birmingham City F.C. players
Gretna F.C. players
York City F.C. players
Swansea City A.F.C. players
Motherwell F.C. players
Burton Albion F.C. players
Exeter City F.C. players
Yeovil Town F.C. players
FK Bodø/Glimt players
Odra Opole players
Scottish Premier League players
National League (English football) players
English Football League players
I liga players
Polish expatriate footballers
Expatriate footballers in England
Expatriate footballers in Scotland
Expatriate footballers in Norway
Polish expatriate sportspeople in England
Polish expatriate sportspeople in Scotland
Polish expatriate sportspeople in Norway